Võhmanõmme is a village in Põltsamaa Parish, Jõgeva County in eastern Estonia.

Võhmanõmme is the birthplace of writer, publicist, linguist and composer Karl August Hermann (1851–1909).

References

Villages in Jõgeva County
Kreis Fellin